Vaucluse is a département in the south of France.

Vaucluse may also refer to:

France
 Vaucluse, Doubs, a commune of the Doubs département in France
 Vaucluse (monastery), a monastery by the River Ain in Jura, France
 Vaucluse Mountains, in France
 Communes of the Vaucluse department

Australia
 Vaucluse, New South Wales, a suburb of the city of Sydney, Australia
 Vaucluse House, in Sydney
 Vaucluse High School
 Vaucluse Public School
 Vaucluse (ferry), a ferry that ran between Circular Quay and Watsons Bay in Sydney
 Vaucluse College

United States
 Vaucluse, South Carolina, a town in Aiken County, United States
 Vaucluse, Virginia, a town in Frederick County, United States
 Vaucluse (Bridgetown, Virginia), a historic plantation house
 Vaucluse, Pleasants County, West Virginia
 Vaucluse (plantation), a plantation in Fairfax County, Virginia, United States

Other
 Vaucluse (horse)